Teucrium integrifolium, commonly known as teucry weed or green germander, is a species of flowering plant in the family Lamiaceae and is endemic to northern Australia. It is a perennial herb with broadly elliptic to broadly egg-shaped leaves and white or cream-coloured flowers.

Description

Taxonomy
Teucrium integrifolium was formally described in 1870 by George Bentham in Flora Australiensis. The specific epithet (integrifolium) means "whole-leaved", referring to the leaves not being toothed or lobed.

Distribution and habitat
Teucry weed grows in grassland and woodland on black clay soil and is widespread in Queensland and the Northern Territory. There are also scattered populations in the Ord Victoria Plain region of Western Australia.

Conservation status
Teucrium integrifolium is classified as "not threatened" by the Western Australian Government Department of Parks and Wildlife, and as of "least concern" under the Queensland Government Nature Conservation Act 1992 and the Northern Territory Government Territory Parks and Wildlife Conservation Act 1976.

References

integrifolium
Lamiales of Australia
Plants described in 1870
Taxa named by George Bentham
Eudicots of Western Australia
Flora of Queensland
Flora of the Northern Territory